Doxing or doxxing (originally spelled d0xing) is the act of publicly providing personally identifiable information about an individual or organization, usually via the Internet. Historically, the term has been used interchangeably to refer to both the aggregation of this information from public databases and social media websites (like Facebook), as well as the publication of previously private information obtained through criminal or otherwise fraudulent means (such as hacking and social engineering). The aggregation and provision of previously published material is generally a legal practice, though it may be subject to laws concerning stalking and intimidation. Doxing may be carried out for reasons such as online shaming, extortion, and vigilante aid to law enforcement. It also may be associated with hacktivism.

Etymology 
"Doxing" is a neologism. It originates from a spelling alteration of the abbreviation "docs", for "documents", and refers to "compiling and releasing a dossier of personal information on someone". Essentially, doxing is revealing and publicizing the records of an individual, which were previously private or difficult to obtain.

The term dox derives from the slang "dropping dox", which, according to a contributor to Wired, Mat Honan, was "an old-school revenge tactic that emerged from hacker culture in 1990s". Hackers operating outside the law in that era used the breach of an opponent's anonymity as a means to expose opponents to harassment or legal repercussions.

Consequently, doxing often comes with a negative connotation because it can be a means of revenge via the violation of privacy.

History 
Outside of hacker communities, the first prominent examples of doxing took place on internet discussion forums on Usenet in the late 1990s, including users circulating lists of suspected neo-Nazis. One of the first documented doxing events was the publication of a "Blacklist of Net.Nazis and Sandlot Bullies" which listed names, email addresses, phone numbers, and mailing addresses of individuals the author objected to. Also in the late 1990s, a website called the Nuremberg Files launched, featuring the home addresses of abortion providers and language that implied website visitors should stalk and kill the people listed.

In 2012, when then-Gawker reporter Adrian Chen revealed the identity of Reddit troll Violentacrez as Michael Brutsch, Reddit users accused Chen of doxing Brutsch and declared "war" on Gawker. In the mid-2010s, the events of the Gamergate harassment campaign brought the term into wider public use. Participants in Gamergate became known for releasing sensitive information about their targets to the public, sometimes with the intent of causing the targets in question physical harm. Caroline Sinders, a research fellow at the Center for Democracy and Technology, said that "Gamergate, for a lot of people, for mainstream culture, was the introduction to what doxxing is".

According to The Atlantic, from 2014 to 2020, "the doxxing conversation was dominated by debate around whether unmasking a pseudonymous person with a sizable following was an unnecessary and dangerous invasion of their privacy." In 2014, when Newsweek attempted to search for the pseudonymous developer of Bitcoin, the magazine was accused of doxing by cryptocurrency enthusiasts. In 2016, when an Italian journalist attempted to search for the identity of the pseudonymous Italian novelist Elena Ferrante, the journalist was accused of gendered harassment and Vox referred to the search as "the doxxing of Elena Ferrante." In 2020, when The New York Times indicated that it was planning on publishing the real name of the California psychiatrist running the Slate Star Codex blog, fans of the blog accused the Times of doxing. The person behind the blog accused the Times of threatening his safety and claimed that he started a "major scandal" that resulted in the Times losing hundreds or thousands of subscriptions.

In 2022, BuzzFeed News reporter Katie Notopoulos used public business records to identify the previously pseudonymous founders of the Bored Ape Yacht Club. Greg Solano, one of the founders of the club, claimed that he "Got doxxed against my will".

On April 19, 2022, The Washington Post reporter Taylor Lorenz revealed the identity of the person behind the Twitter account Libs of TikTok as Chaya Raichik, who works in real estate. This resulted in Raichik and right-wingers accusing Lorenz of doxing.

Doxware is a cryptovirology attack invented by Adam Young and further developed with Moti Yung that carries out doxing extortion via malware. It was first presented at West Point in 2003. The attack is rooted in game theory and was originally dubbed "non-zero-sum games and survivable malware".

The attack is summarized in the book Malicious Cryptography as follows:

The attack differs from the extortion attack in the following way. In the extortion attack, the victim is denied access to its own valuable information and has to pay to get it back, where in the attack that is presented here the victim retains access to the information but its disclosure is at the discretion of the computer virus.

Doxware is the converse of ransomware. In a ransomware attack (originally called cryptoviral extortion), the malware encrypts the victim's data and demands payment to provide the needed decryption key. In the doxware cryptovirology attack, the attacker or malware steals the victim's data and threatens to publish it unless a fee is paid.

Common techniques 
Once people have been exposed through doxing, they may be targeted for harassment through methods such as harassment in person, fake signups for mail and pizza deliveries, or through swatting (dispatching armed police to their house through spoofed tips).

A hacker may obtain an individual's dox without making the information public. A hacker may look for this information to extort or coerce a known or unknown target. A hacker may also harvest a victim's information to break into their Internet accounts or take over their social media accounts.

Doxing has also occurred in dating apps. In a survey conducted in 2021, 16% of respondents reported suffering doxing because of them. In a 2018 qualitative studio about intimate partner violence, 28 out of 89 participants (both professionals and survivors) reported the exposure of the victim's private information to third parties through digital technologies as a form of humiliation, shaming or harm frequently practiced by abusers, that may include the disclosure of intimate images and impersonation of the victim.

Victims may also be shown their details as proof that they have been doxed as a form of intimidation. The perpetrator may use this fear to gain power over victims in order to extort or coerce. Doxing is therefore a standard tactic of online harassment and has been used by people associated with the Gamergate and vaccine controversies.

Examples

Doxing of abortion providers

In the United States, in the 1970s and 80s (paper) and the 1990s (digitally), anti-abortion activists secured abortion providers' personal information, such as home addresses, phone numbers, and photographs, and posted them as a hit list. The courts later ruled this to be an immediate incitement to violence. Between 1993 and 2016, eight abortion providers were killed by anti-abortion activists, along with at least four police officers.

Human flesh search engine 

Starting in March 2006, the Chinese Internet phenomenon of the "Human flesh search engine"（人肉搜索）shares much in common with doxing. Specifically, it refers to distributed, sometimes deliberately crowdsourced searches for similar kinds of information through use of digital media.

Anonymous 

The term "dox" entered mainstream public awareness through media attention attracted by Anonymous, the Internet-based group of hacktivists and pranksters who make frequent use of doxing, as well as related groups like AntiSec and LulzSec. The Washington Post has described the consequences for innocent people incorrectly accused of wrongdoing and doxed as "nightmarish".

In December 2011, Anonymous exposed detailed information of 7,000 law enforcement members in response to investigations into hacking activities.

In November 2014, Anonymous began releasing the identities of members of the Ku Klux Klan. This was concerning local Klan members in Ferguson, Missouri, making threats to shoot those protesting the shooting of Michael Brown. Anonymous also hijacked the group's Twitter page, causing Klan members to make veiled threats of violence against members of Anonymous. In November 2015, a major release of information about the KKK was planned. Discredited information was released prematurely, and Anonymous denied involvement. On 5 November 2015 (Guy Fawkes Night), Anonymous released an official list of supposed, but currently unverified, KKK members and sympathizers.

Boston Marathon

Following the 15 April 2013 Boston Marathon bombing, internet vigilantes on Reddit wrongly identified a number of people as suspects. Notable among misidentified bombing suspects was Sunil Tripathi, a student reported missing before the bombings took place. A body reported to be Tripathi's was found in Rhode Island's Providence River on 25 April 2013, as reported by the Rhode Island Health Department. The cause of death was not immediately known, but authorities said they did not suspect foul play. The family later confirmed Tripathi's death was a result of suicide. Reddit general manager Erik Martin later issued an apology for this behavior, criticizing the "online witch hunts and dangerous speculation" that took place on the website.

Journalists 

Journalists with The Journal News of Westchester County, New York were accused of doxing gun owners in the region in a story the paper published in December 2012.

Newsweek was criticized when writer Leah McGrath Goodman claimed to have revealed the identity of the anonymous creator of Bitcoin, Satoshi Nakamoto. Although she primarily drew on the public record, users on Reddit responded negatively.

The Satoshi Nakamoto case brought doxing to greater attention on platforms such as Twitter, where users questioned the ethics of doxing in journalism. Many Twitter users argued that the practice was seemingly acceptable for professional journalists but wrong for anyone else. Other users discussed the effect the popularization that the concept of doxing could have on journalism in the public interest, raising questions over journalism concerning public and private figures in which journalists practicing doxing may blur the line between reporting information in the public's interest and releasing information about the private life of an individual without their consent.

In September 2019, The Des Moines Register published racist tweets made by a 24-year-old Iowa man whose beer sign on ESPN College GameDay resulted in over $1 million in contributions to a children's hospital. Readers retaliated by sharing social media comments previously made by the reporter, Aaron Calvin, which contained racial slurs and condemnation of law enforcement. The newspaper later announced they no longer employed Calvin.

Curt Schilling 
In March 2015, former Major League Baseball (MLB) pitcher Curt Schilling used doxing to identify several people responsible for "Twitter troll" posts with obscene, sexually explicit comments about his teenage daughter. One person was suspended from his community college, and another lost a part-time job with the New York Yankees.

Alondra Cano 
In December 2015, Minneapolis city council member Alondra Cano used her Twitter account to publish private cellphone numbers and e-mail addresses of critics who wrote about her involvement in a Black Lives Matter rally.

HIPAA Federal Register 6039G 
The Health Insurance Portability and Accountability Act of 1996 (HIPAA) is a US federal law that requires the creation of national standards to protect sensitive patient health information from being disclosed without the patient’s consent or knowledge. Embedded in that act, that is designed to protect the privacy of the patient, is ironically a provision that requires the Internal Revenue Service (IRS) to publish the names of Americans who renounce or relinquish their US citizenship. The IRS will publish a Quarterly Publication of Individuals Who Have Chosen to Expatriate, as Required by Section 6039G, 81 Fed. Reg. 50058. The expatriation provisions were included as "revenue offsets... to avoid increasing the budget deficit." The expressed intent originated in The Expatriation Tax Act of 1995 by Bill Archer to publicly shame the expatriating individuals.

Lou Dobbs 
In 2016, Fox Business news anchor Lou Dobbs revealed the address and phone number of Jessica Leeds, one of the women who accused American presidential candidate Donald Trump of inappropriate sexual advances; Dobbs later apologized.

Erdoğan emails 
In July 2016, WikiLeaks released 300,000 e-mails called the Erdoğan emails, initially thought to be damaging to Turkish President Recep Tayyip Erdoğan. Included in the leak was Michael Best, who uploaded Turkish citizens' information databases that WikiLeaks promoted, who came forward to say that doing so was a mistake after the site where he uploaded the information took it down. The files were removed due to privacy concerns. They included spreadsheets of private, sensitive information of what appears to be every female voter in 79 out of 81 provinces in Turkey, including their home addresses and other private information, sometimes including their cellphone numbers.

Michael Hirsh 
In November 2016, Politico editor Michael Hirsh resigned after publishing the home address of white nationalist Richard B. Spencer on Facebook.

U.S. Presidential Advisory Commission on Election Integrity
In July 2017, the United States' Presidential Advisory Commission on Election Integrity, which was established in May 2017 by U.S. President Donald Trump to investigate his controversial allegation of voter fraud, published a 112-page document of unredacted emails of public comment on its work, which included both critics and supporters of the Commission. The Commission included the personal details of those critics, such as names, emails, phone numbers and home addresses. Most of the commenters who wrote to the White House expressed concern about publication of their personal information, with one person writing, "DO NOT RELEASE ANY OF MY VOTER DATA PERIOD." Despite this, that person's name and email address were published by the commission.

This act drew criticism from Theresa Lee, a staff attorney for the American Civil Liberties Union's Voting Rights Project, who stated, "This cavalier attitude toward the public's personal information is especially concerning given the commission's request for sensitive data on every registered voter in the country." The White House defended the personal information publication, noting that everyone was warned that might happen. However, former Deputy Secretary of Labor Chris Lu stated that regardless of the legality, the White House has a moral obligation to protect sensitive data, saying, "Whether or not it's legal to disclose this personal information, it's clearly improper, and no responsible White House would do this."

Federal agencies often solicit and release public comments on proposed legislation. Regulations.gov, which is designated for public comments, includes a detailed set of guidelines explaining how to submit comments, what type of personal information is collected, and how that information may be used, stating, "Some agencies may require that you include personal information, such as your name and email address, on the comment form. The Securities and Exchange Commission, for instance, warns commenters to 'submit only information that you wish to make available publicly.'" Another agency, the Federal Trade Commission, tells commenters that "published comments include the commenter's last name and state/country as well as the entire text of the comment. Please do not include any sensitive or confidential information." However, The White House does not appear to have issued any such public guidelines or warnings before many of the emails were sent. Marc Lotter, Press Secretary to Mike Pence, stated, "These are public comments, similar to individuals appearing before commission to make comments and providing name before making comments. The Commission’s Federal Register notice asking for public comments and its website make clear that information 'including names and contact information' sent to this email address may be released."

Democratic U.S. House of Representatives intern 
On 3 October 2018, Jackson Cosko, a House fellow for the Democratic Party, was arrested by the U.S. Capitol Police (USCP). He allegedly posted private, identifying information of several Senators to Wikipedia. According to the USCP, the personal information of Republican Senators Lindsey Graham, Mike Lee and Orrin Hatch was anonymously posted to Wikipedia the week before on Thursday 27 September 2018. The information included home addresses and phone numbers. All three lawmakers are with the Senate Judiciary Committee. The alleged doxing occurred during the hearing of Supreme Court nominee Judge Brett Kavanaugh. Cosko was initially charged with witness tampering, threats in interstate communications, unauthorized access of a government computer, identity theft, second degree burglary and unlawful entry. Cosko was fired after his arrest. He worked with Democratic Rep. Sheila Jackson Lee (D-TX), Sen. Dianne Feinstein (D-Calif), Sen. Maggie Hassan (D-N.H.), and former Sen. Barbara Boxer (D-Calif). Conviction of all six charges might have resulted in Cosko facing up to 20 years in prison. However, in June 2019, he was sentenced by Judge Thomas F. Hogan to four years in prison. An accomplice, Samantha DeForest Davis, was sentenced to two years of supervised probation and community service.

Taylor Lorenz (Libs of TikTok) 
On April 19, 2022, The Washington Post published an article written by journalist Taylor Lorenz. The article addressed the TikTok account named Libs of TikTok. In the article Lorenz revealed the accounts owner's real name, which previously operated anonymously.

Lorenz argued that Raichik's information was already publicly available.

In the article Lorenz revealed the account owner as an Orthodox Jew, which led to claims of Antisemitism.

The owner personally called out Lorenz saying she "will never be silenced"

YouTuber Tim Pool and The Daily Wire CEO Jeremy Boreing purchased a billboard in Times Square to accuse Lorenz of doxxing. In response, Lorenz called the billboard "so idiotic it's hilarious".

Lisa-Maria Kellermayr

Lisa-Maria Kellermayr, an Austrian doctor, received targeted harassment, including death threats, first online, then in person, by anti-vaccination and conspiracy theorist groups during the COVID-19 pandemic until she took her life in July 2022. The harassment she received included attacks against the clinic in Seewalchen am Attersee where she worked, and that she had to close weeks before her death due to security costs.

Keffals swatting and doxing

On August 5, 2022, Canadian Twitch streamer and transgender activist Clara Sorrenti was swatted after an e-mail impersonating her claiming intent to harm city councillors of London, Ontario.  After this incident, she moved to a hotel. Her new location was posted in Kiwi Farms, a forum frequently related to harassment campaigns that included a thread disclosing personal data from her, her family members and her friends, as well as sexually explicit content, which was started in March 21 of the same year, after what she started to receive prank pizza orders by trolls who used her former name, changed more than a decade before. At the time, police were also investigating a second doxing attempt. Sorrenti's Uber account was hacked days after the hotel location incident, leading to her receiving new prank orders. After that, she reported having been doxed again and her will to leave Canada, given the targeted harassment she was receiving. Days later, her new location in Belfast, Northern Ireland was posted online and a new swatting attempt was made. Sorrenti campaigned for online security firm Cloudflare to terminate services for Kiwifarms, citing life-threatening harassment originating in the site. On September 3, 2022, the firm blocked access to Kiwifarms through its infrastructure, mentioning "an imminent and emergency threat to human life".

Elon Musk
In December 2022 business magnate and investor Elon Musk, who was also CEO of Twitter, Inc., suspended the Twitter accounts of several journalists, whom he accused of doxing the location of his private jet, related to the social media account ElonJet. Two days later the accounts were restored.

Anti-doxing services
Parallel to the rise of doxing has been the evolution of cybersecurity, internet privacy, the Online Privacy Alliance, and even companies that provide anti-doxing services. Most recently, high profile groups like the University of California Berkeley have made online guidance for protecting its community members from doxing. Wired published an article on dealing with doxing, in which Eva Galperin, from the Electronic Frontier Foundation, advises people to "Google yourself, lock yourself down, make it harder to access information about you."

Legislation

Mainland China
From March 1, 2020, the People’s Republic of China’s "Regulations on the Ecological Governance of Online Information Content" has been implemented, clarifying that users and producers of online information content services and platforms must not engage in online violence, doxing, deep forgery, data fraud, account manipulation and other illegal activities.

Hong Kong
As of 2021, it is a criminal offense in Hong Kong to dox, where doxing is defined as releasing private or non-public information on a person for the purposes of "threatening, intimidation, harassment or to cause psychological harm". Persons convicted under this statute are liable to imprisonment for up to 5 years, and a fine of HK$1,000,000 (US$128,324.40).

South Korea
South Korea stands as one of few countries with a criminal statute that specifically addresses doxing. Article 49 of "Act on promotion of information and communications network utilization, and information protection" prohibits unlawful collection and dissemination of private information such as full name, birth date, address, likeliness, and any other information that is deemed sufficient to identify specific person(s) when viewed in summation, regardless of intent. In practice, however, due to the ambiguous nature of "unlawful collection" of private information in said statute, legal actions are often based upon article 44 from the same act, which prohibits insulting an individual with language derogatory or profane, and defamation of an individual through the dissemination of either misinformation or privileged factual information that may potentially damage an individual's reputation or honor (which often occurs in a doxing incident). It is important to note that this particular clause enforces harsher maximum sentences than a "traditional" defamation statute existing in the Korean criminal code and was originally enacted partially in response to the rise in celebrity suicides due to cyberbullying.

Spain
The Spanish Criminal Code regulates penalties for the discovery and revelation of secrets in articles 197 to 201. It establishes, in its article 197 § 1, that "whoever, in order to discover the secrets or violate the privacy of another, without their consent, seizes their papers, letters, e-mail messages or any other documents or personal effects, intercepts their telecommunications or uses technical devices for listening, transmission, recording or reproduction of sound or image, or any other communication signal, shall be punished with prison sentences of one to four years and a fine of twelve to twenty-four months". Per article 197 § 2, the same penalty punishes those who "seize, use or modify, to the detriment of a third party, reserved personal or family data of another that is registered in computer, electronic or telematic files or media, or in any other type of file or public or private record". Those who "disseminate, disclose or transfer" the aforementioned data to third parties face a penalty of two to five prison years (one to three years of prison and fines of twelve to twenty-four months, if not directly involved in their discovery but "with knowledge of its illicit origin") per article 197 § 3. These offenses are particularly severe if made by the person responsible of the respective files, media, records or archives or through unauthorized use of personal data, if revealing of the ideology, religion, beliefs, health, racial origin or sexual life of the victim, if the victim is underage or disabled, and if it is made for economic profit.

As established by the Criminal Code's reform in 2015, to "disseminate, disclose or transfer to third parties images or audiovisual recordings of the one obtained with their consent in a home or in any other place out of sight of third parties, when the disclosure seriously undermines the personal privacy of that person", without the authorization of the affected person, is also punished per article 197 § 7 to three months to a year in prison and fines of six to twelve moths. The offense is particularly severe if the victim is linked to the offender by marriage or an "analogous affective relationship", underage, or disabled.

The Netherlands
In 2021, due to increasing doxing incidents targeting Dutch activists, politicians, journalists and others, a new law against doxing was proposed by then Minister of Justice and Security Ferdinand Grapperhaus. The law is aimed at curtailing those who share private information with the intent of intimidation, and carries a maximum penalty of a one-year prison sentence.

The United States
In the United States, there are currently few legal remedies for the victims of doxing. Currently two federal laws exist that could potentially address the problem of doxing: the Interstate Communications Statute and the Interstate Stalking Statute.  However, as one scholar has argued, "[t]hese statutes...are woefully inadequate to prevent doxing because their terms are underinclusive and they are rarely enforced".  The Interstate Communications Statute, for example, "only criminalizes explicit threats to kidnap or injure a person".  But in many instances of doxing, a doxer may never convey an explicit threat to kidnap or injure, but the victim could still have good reason to be terrified.  And the Interstate Stalking Statute "is rarely enforced and it serves only as a hollow protection from online harassment". According to at least one estimate, over three million people are stalked over the internet each year, yet only about three are charged under the Interstate Stalking Statute. Accordingly, "[t]his lack of federal enforcement means that the States must step in if doxing is to be reduced".

See also 
 Data re-identification
 Doomscrolling
 Doxbin
 Escrache
 Identity theft
 Is Anyone Up?
 Kiwi Farms
 Opposition research
 Outing
 Quarterly Publication of Individuals Who Have Chosen to Expatriate
 Skiptracing

References

Sources

External links

Cyberbullying
Cybercrime
Data security
Hacking (computer security)
Internet privacy
Internet terminology
Internet vigilantism
Identity documents
Privacy controversies and disputes